Cho-yun Hsu (born Sep 3, 1930) is a historian born in Xiamen, China, of Wuxi ancestry. His family moved to Taiwan after the Chinese Communist Revolution. He graduated from National Taiwan University (B.A.) and University of Chicago (Ph.D.) and held academic positions in Academia Sinica in Taiwan (1956-1971), before moving to University of Pittsburgh in 1970. He was elected as a Member of the Academica Sinica in 1980. 

Hsu's scholarly works have been largely on Chinese history, emphasizing on cultural history, socio-economic history and ancient Chinese history. He was noted for his utilization of scientific methods and theories from social sciences. His major works include Western Chou Civilization (1990 Yale University Press), Ancient China in Transition (1965 Stanford University Press), and Han Agriculture (1980 University of Washington Press). His work in Chinese Wangu jianghe (2009 Echo), translated into English as China: A New Cultural History (2012 Columbia University Press), narrates the full course of development of Chinese culture in the perspective of globalization. 

Hsu is also known for his advocacy and advisory work during the democratic transition in Taiwan. He is an Emeritus Professor of History and Sociology at the University of Pittsburgh where he taught from 1970 until his retirement in 1998, and has served in honorary positions in several universities including Duke University, Nanjing University, and Chinese University of Hong Kong. Hsu is a contributing columnist for Chinese newspapers including China Times, United Daily News in Taiwan and Southern City News System in China．

Hsu is one of the founding members of the Chiang Ching-kuo Foundation for International Scholarly Exchange, and has served as chair of its North American Committee since 1989.  During the 1990s, he was instrumental in providing funding to a number of universities and colleges to establish teaching positions on Chinese studies. He oversaw a gradual shift in the Foundation's grants from established scholars to young scholars. Hsu recommended CCK Foundation grants to libraries to catalog rare Chinese books and to digitize historic maps of East Asia.

Books 
Hsu authored or coauthored numerous publications:
Ancient China in Transition: an Analysis of Social Mobility, 722–222 B.C. (Stanford Calif.: Stanford University Press, 1965; paperback edition, 1968)
Sir Herbert Butterfield, Cho Yun Hsu and William H. McNeill on Chinese and World History, ed. with introd. and three essays by *Noah Edward Fehl (Hong Kong: Chinese University of Hong Kong, 1970)
Han Agriculture: the Formation of Early Chinese Agrarian Economy, 206 B.C.–A.D. 220, ed. Jack L. Dull (Seattle: University of Washington Press, 1980)
Bibliographic Notes on Studies of Early China (San Francisco: Chinese Materials Center, 1982)
Western Chou Civilization, co-authored with Katheryn M. Linduff (New Haven: Yale University Press, 1988)
Exploring Interpretation in Chinese History (World Scientific Publishing Co., 1996)
China: A New Cultural History (Columbia University Press, 2012)

References

External links 
 Video lecture given by Cho-yun Hsu at the Library of Congress in 2004
 Cho-yun Hsu papers at the University of Pittsburgh

1930 births
Chinese emigrants to the United States
American sinologists
Living people
University of Pittsburgh faculty
University of Chicago alumni
Republic of China historians
Taiwanese emigrants to the United States
People from Xiamen
21st-century American historians
21st-century American male writers
Taiwanese people from Fujian
Historians from Fujian
Educators from Fujian
American male non-fiction writers